Cheryl Murphy (born October 17, 1978) is an American martial artist. She is a member of Team USA and a current Shotokan Karate fighter.  She is stated to be a world class competition kumite competitor.

Personal life 
She was born in Olympia, Washington and resides in Queens, NY.  She received her master's degree in Community Health at Long Island University.

Career 
She competes in the  division. Murphy has been a member of the Senior US Team since 2002.  Murphy is ranked by the World Karate Federation She won the national division, US Open, and a gold medal in the 2012 Pan Americans. Murphy competed in the fifth World University Karate Championships in New York.  She has held numerous top 5 rankings in Karate  In 2011, she finished 9th in the Pan Am games  She competed at the Karate at the 2013 World Combat Games, winning a bronze medal.

She is strong advocate of Karate being inducted into the Olympic Games and now works for FNB as a Quartz CFC person

References

External links
 

1978 births
Sportspeople from Olympia, Washington
Living people
American female karateka
Shotokan practitioners
Pan American Games medalists in karate
Pan American Games bronze medalists for the United States
Karateka at the 2003 Pan American Games
Karateka at the 2011 Pan American Games
Medalists at the 2003 Pan American Games
21st-century American women
20th-century American women